The Aripuanã National Forest is a national forest in the state of Amazonas, Brazil.
It supports sustainable forestry, and also protects the environment, supports scientific research and protects the sustainable lifestyle of the traditional inhabitants of the forest.

Location

The Aripuanã National Forest covers parts of the municipalities of Novo Aripuanã (73.71%), Manicoré (9.27%) and Apuí (17.03%) in the state of Amazonas.
The forest lies to the north of the Trans-Amazonian Highway (BR-230). 
The Aripuanã River, a tributary of the Madeira River, flows north through the forest.
The Manicoré Biological Reserve and the Campos de Manicoré Environmental Protection Area adjoin the forest to the west, and the Acari National Park lies to the east. 
The Juma Sustainable Development Reserve is to the north.

Environment

The forest is in the Amazon biome.
The forest has great biological wealth, with at least three species of primate and two of birds discovered in the decade before it was created.
Vegetation is mainly dense rainforest with some pioneer formations, and has not suffered as much deforestation as other areas of the Amazon.
The reserve holds a wide range of palm tree species, and has endangered tree species such as the Bertholletia excelsa, Amburana cearensis var. Acreana, Swietenia macrophylla and Aniba rosaeodora.
The region has a variety of environments and diverse fauna, although there have been few studies.
The Madeira River basin is estimated to harbor about 800 species of birds, and is an area with many primates including endemic species.

History

Creation of the Aripuanã National Forest and other conservation units created at the same time followed studies by the Chico Mendes Institute for Biodiversity Conservation (ICMBio) with support from the Ministry of the Environment, financed by the Amazon Protected Areas Program (ARPA).
The Aripuanã National Forest  was created by presidential decree on 11 May 2016.
It is administered by ICMBio.
The soils are acidic and low fertility, so unsuitable for agriculture or grazing, but the region has been feeling growing pressure from loggers, ranchers and soybean farmers since 2005. 
The reserve is part of a shield designed to protect the heart of the Amazon forest from the advance of deforestation.
The forest will let the local economy grow based on sustainable forest management.
It will also help maintain biodiversity and water resource, support scientific research and protect the traditional residents.

The reserve is one of five conservation units created in the last week before the provisional removal of president Dilma Rousseff, totalling , all in the south of Amazonas state.

Her administration had also reduced the area of seven protected areas in the Amazon to allow for construction of dams on the Tapajós.

Notes

Sources

2016 establishments in Brazil
National forests of Brazil
Protected areas of Amazonas (Brazilian state)